Revenge of the Ninja  is a 1983 American martial arts–thriller film directed by Sam Firstenberg, and starring martial artist Sho Kosugi, Keith Vitali, Virgil Frye and Kane Kosugi. The plot follows a ninja trying to protect his only son from a cabal of ruthless gangsters.

It is the second installment in Cannon Films' "Ninja Trilogy" anthology series, starting with Enter the Ninja (1981) and ending with Ninja III: The Domination (1984). It was very successful at the box office, despite receiving mixed reviews from critics.

Plot
In Japan, the home of Cho Osaki is attacked by an army of a rival ninja clan, resulting in the slaughter of his entire family except for his mother and his younger son, Kane. When Cho arrives at his estate and discovers the carnage, the ninjas attempt to kill him as well, but Cho, a highly skilled ninja himself, avenges his family and kills the attacking ninjas. Afterwards, however, he swears off being a ninja forever and moves with his son and mother to America, where he opens an Oriental art gallery with the help of his American business partner and friend, Braden, and his assistant Cathy.

One night, Kane accidentally drops and breaks open one of the dolls, exposing a white dust (which is in actuality, heroin) contained therein. As it turns out, Braden uses the doll gallery as a front for his drug-smuggling business. He tries to strike a deal with Caifano, a mob boss, but Caifano and Braden cannot find common ground and eventually engage in a turf war. Braden, as a silver "demon"-masked ninja, assassinates Caifano's informers and relatives to make him cower down. The police are confused about the killings, and local police martial arts trainer and expert, Dave Hatcher, is assigned to find a consultant. Dave persuades his friend Cho to see his boss, and Cho attests that only a ninja could commit these crimes, but refuses to aid the police any further.

In order to avoid payment for his 'merchandise', Caifano sends four men to rob the gallery. Cho happens to walk into the gallery while the thugs are loading the goods in a van, is attacked and responds with hand-to-hand combat. The henchmen escape in the van with Cho in pursuit, but he fails to stop the thieves from getting away. Meanwhile, Braden stealthily arrives at Cho's art gallery to find that it was just looted. Cho's mother and Kane both encounter him; Braden kills Cho's mother, but Kane manages to elude him. Cho, badly mangled, returns to find his mother murdered and his son missing.

In order to finish the last witness, Braden hypnotizes Cathy, who is in love with Cho, to find and bring in Kane. When she recovers her senses, she contacts Cho and informs him both of Braden's treachery and that he is a ninja. Seeing his only remaining son in mortal danger, Cho breaks his devotion to non-violence and makes his way to Caifano's headquarters to stop Braden. In the meantime, Braden finds out about Cathy's betrayal and prepares to have her executed. Kane manages to free himself and Cathy, and the two inform the authorities.

Braden makes his final assault on Caifano and his organization, killing all he encounters. Eager to help Cho, Dave also rushes to Caifano's headquarters but is ambushed by Braden, who mortally wounds him. Cho rushes to help his faithful friend, but the latter dies in his arms. Braden and Cho duel to the death on top of Caifano's skyscraper. After a long fight, Cho manages to kill Braden and is reunited with his son and Cathy as the film draws to a close.

Cast
 Sho Kosugi as Cho Osaki
 Keith Vitali as Dave Hatcher
 Virgil Frye as Lieutenant Dime
 Arthur Roberts as Braden
 Mario Gallo as Caifano
 Grace Oshita as Grandmother
 Ashley Ferrare as Cathy
 Kane Kosugi as Kane Osaki
 John LaMotta as Joe
 Professor Toru Tanaka as Sumo servant

Production
The film was originally intended to be shot in Los Angeles, but the necessary permits, police protection, fire marshals and myriad logistics fees threatened to take up a bigger and bigger part of the film's budget. The Utah Film Commission was trying to get Cannon Films to start producing films in their state and a representative promised no permits, location fees or union deals as well as lower salaries for local crews. The commission's assurances persuaded Cannon to switch filming to Salt Lake City. The final rooftop fight scene between Kosugi and Roberts took two weeks to film. This was due to the required pyrotechnics, mechanical rigging, safety considerations, elaborate camera positioning (including hanging 20 stories high outside the building), and helicopter shots.

Box office
The film made $13,168,027 domestically in the United States, equivalent to $38,800,130 adjusted for inflation in 2021.

In Germany, it sold 333,182 tickets in 1984, equivalent to an estimated  in gross revenue. In France, it sold 32,200 tickets in 1984, equivalent to an estimated . This adds up to an estimated total of approximately  grossed worldwide.

In terms of box office admissions, it sold  tickets in the United States, 32,200 tickets in France, and 333,182 tickets in Germany, for a combined  tickets sold worldwide.

Reception

Rotten Tomatoes lists three reviews, so no aggregate rating is given on the site; two reviews are positive and one negative. On Metacritic, the film has a weighted average score of 32 out of 100, based on 5 critics, indicating "generally unfavorable reviews".

The film became a cult hit due to its elaborate martial arts sequences and B-movie production values. Variety gave it a generally favorable review, calling it "an entertaining martial arts actioner" and praising the "fight choreography by Kosugi", despite lacking the "name players and Far East locale" of Enter the Ninja.

Home media 
The film was released on Blu-ray in Australia in June 2017.

See also

 List of American films of 1983
 List of martial arts films
 List of ninja films

References

External links
 
 
 
 
 Interview with Keith Vitali at cityonfire.com

1983 films
1983 action thriller films
1983 martial arts films
Golan-Globus films
American independent films
1980s English-language films
Films directed by Sam Firstenberg
Films about the illegal drug trade
Films set in Japan
Films set in Utah
Films shot in Salt Lake City
Ninja films
Metro-Goldwyn-Mayer films
United Artists films
Films scored by Robert J. Walsh
Japan in non-Japanese culture
Films produced by Menahem Golan
Films produced by Yoram Globus
1980s American films